Salto is a city in Buenos Aires Province, Argentina. It is the administrative headquarters for Salto Partido. It is about 200 km (124 mi) from Buenos Aires and 55 km ( 34 mi) from Pergamino. Salto is an agricultural community, crossed by a river, that it has some of the best fields of the province. Its main crops are soybean, corn and sorghum. It also has some important factories such as Arcor, Pioneer Hi-Bred, Metrive and Soychú.

External links

 Municipal website

Populated places in Buenos Aires Province